The 1982–83 Dallas Mavericks season was the team's third season in the National Basketball Association (NBA).

Draft picks

Roster

Regular season

Season standings

Record vs. opponents

Game log

Player statistics

References

Dallas Mavericks seasons
Dallas
Dallas
Dallas